Dmitry Kabalevsky's Preludes, Op. 38 are a set of 24 piano pieces in the Chopinian model, each based on a folksong and each in a different key. It was composed in 1943–44, and dedicated to Nikolai Myaskovsky, his teacher.   It is one of a number of examples of music written in all 24 major and minor keys.

The score is headed by a quote from Mikhail Lermontov on Russian folksong.

List of preludes
Andantino. C major. 27 bars. 
Scherzando. A minor. 38 bars. 
Vivace leggiero. G major. 53 bars
Andantino. E minor. 63 bars.
Andante sostenuto. D major. 45 bars.
Allegro molto. B minor. 35 bars.
Moderato e tranquillo. A major. 26 bars.
Andante non troppo. Semplice e cantando – Poco Agitato – Tempo I. F-sharp minor. 29 bars.
Allegretto scherzando – Poco più mosso. E major. 63 bars.
Non troppo allegro ma agitato. Recitando, rubato – Largo – Come prima – Largo. C-sharp minor. 43 bars.
Vivace scherzando. B major. 61 bars.
Adagio. G-sharp minor. 35 bars.
Allegro non troppo. F-sharp major. 69 bars.
Prestissimo possibile. E-flat minor. 100 bars. 
Allegretto marcato. D-flat major. 32 bars.
Allegro tenebroso. B-flat minor. 59 bars.
Andantino tranquillo. A-flat major. 41 bars.
Largamente con gravita. F minor. 13 bars.
Allegretto. E-flat major. 35 bars.
Andantino semplice. C minor. 53 bars.
Festivamente. Non troppo allegro. B-flat major. 57 bars.
Scherzando. Non troppo allegro. G minor. 62 bars.
Andante sostenuto. F major. 30 bars.
Allegro feroce – Meno mosso. Marciale. – Pochissimo più mosso – Poco meno mosso.. D minor. 105 bars.

References
 Peters's edition of the score; Edition Peters Mo. 4785 – E.P.122225 – Licence-no. 415-300/285/73. Röderdruck, Leipzig (GDR)

Compositions by Dmitry Kabalevsky
1944 compositions
Kabalevsky
Compositions for solo piano
Kabalevsky